Michael Replogle is an internationally recognized expert in the field of sustainable transport. He co-founded the Institute for Transportation and Development Policy (ITDP) in 1985, a nonprofit organization that promotes environmentally sustainable and equitable transportation projects and policies worldwide, as well as Bikes Not Bombs in 1984. He was the president of ITDP from 1985–1992 and 1998-2009, and managing director of ITDP from 2009-2015. His seminal 1987 paper on sustainable transport was the first to define the term.

Replogle was appointed Deputy Commissioner for Policy of the New York City Department of Transportation in June 2015, to develop strategy and advise the City on transportation issues. He manages DOT's Policy Division which is preparing an agency-wide strategic plan, advancing Vision Zero efforts to eliminate road-crash related deaths and serious injuries, and shaping freight and parking strategy, climate change mitigation and resiliency, and shared mobility. Other key initiatives support the City's engagement with the Metropolitan Transportation Authority and Port Authority, federal transportation policy and grants, transportation elements of the City’s neighborhood development plans, and enhancing access for persons with disabilities.

Replogle co-founded the Partnership on Sustainable, Low Carbon Transport (SLoCaT) in 2009
 and through that helped secure a $175 billion 10-year commitment from the world's largest multilateral development banks to support sustainable transport,  with annual reporting and monitoring. Michael Replogle is currently the board chairman of the SLoCaT Foundation.
Replogle managed development of new tools and methods to evaluate greenhouse gas emissions and other impacts of transportation projects and programs for the Asian Development Bank  and Global Environment Facility with CAI-Asia.

As transportation director of the Environmental Defense Fund from 1992-2009, he influenced U.S. federal transportation and environmental legislation and regulations, frequently testifying in the U.S. Congress. He has advised on metropolitan transportation plans and policies in Washington, Baltimore, New York, Denver, Atlanta, Portland (OR), Mexico City, Beijing, and other areas to promote more integrated transportation and land use planning, public transportation, sound transport pricing, and transportation system management and operations. He managed integrated transport and land use planning and modeling for Montgomery County, Maryland from 1983-1992.

He was a member of the Advisory Committee for the United Nations Centre for Regional Development and an active emeritus member of the Transportation Research Board Committee on Transportation in the Developing Countries, which he helped found. He has been a long-time advisor to the U.S. Department of Transportation (DOT), most recently through its advisory committees on Transportation Statistics  and Intelligent Transportation and travel modeling. He served on the World Economic Forum Global Agenda Council on the Future of Transportation.

Replogle received an M.E.S. and Honor B.E.S. in Civil and Urban Engineering and an Honor Bachelor of Arts in Sociology, all from the University of Pennsylvania.

Replogle is the author of a book on access to public transportation, a seminal report for the World Bank on non-motorized transportation in Asian cities, several hundred magazine articles, and dozens of journal articles and reports.

Select Publications
•	Replogle, M. with Colin Hughes, “Moving Toward Sustainable Transport,” 2012 State of The World Report, Worldwatch Institute, Washington, DC.

•	Replogle, M., “Environmental Evaluation in Urban Transport,” in Harry T. Dimitriou & Ralph Gackenheimer (eds.), Urban Transport in the Developing World Edward Elgar Publishers (2011).

•	Replogle, M. No More Just Throwing Money Out the Window:  Using Road Tolls to Cut Congestion, Protect the Environment, and Boost Access for All, Environmental Defense Fund. (2008)

•	Testimony of Michael Replogle, Transportation Director, Environmental Defense, Before the Senate Environment and Public Works Committee, United States Senate, July 30, 2002.

•	[http://ntl.bts.gov/lib/16000/16000/16019/PB2000102159.pdf Replogle, M. 'Intelligent Transportation Systems for Sustainable Communities, National Policy Conference on Intelligent Transportation Systems and the Environment, U.S. Department of Transportation (1994)].

•	Replogle, M. with Harriet Parcells, Linking bicycle/pedestrian facilities with transit: enhancing bicycle and pedestrian access to transit, U.S. Federal Highway Administration (1992).

•	Replogle, M. “Sustainability: A Vital Concept for Transportation Planning and Development,” Journal of Advanced Transportation (1990).
 
•	Replogle, M., Non-Motorized Vehicles in Asian Cities, prepared as part of the World Bank Asia Urban Transport Sector Study, (1990).

•	Replogle, M. Bicycles and Public Transportation: New Links to Suburban Transit Markets'', Rodale Press (1983).

References

Living people
Sustainable transport pioneers
American male writers
Year of birth missing (living people)